Shirley is a town in Piscataquis County, Maine, United States. The town was named after Shirley, Massachusetts. The population was 251 at the 2020 census. It was the birthplace of humorist Bill Nye.

Geography

Demographics

2010 census
As of the census of 2010, there were 233 people, 116 households, and 63 families living in the town. The racial makeup of the town was 99.6% White and 0.4% Asian.

There were 116 households, of which 10.3% had children under the age of 18 living with them, 49.1% were married couples living together, 2.6% had a female householder with no husband present, 2.6% had a male householder with no wife present, and 45.7% were non-families. 36.2% of all households were made up of individuals, and 8.6% had someone living alone who was 65 years of age or older. The average household size was 2.01 and the average family size was 2.63.

The median age in the town was 53.6 years. 12.9% of residents were under the age of 18; 3% were between the ages of 18 and 24; 19.8% were from 25 to 44; 44.1% were from 45 to 64; and 20.2% were 65 years of age or older. The gender makeup of the town was 53.6% male and 46.4% female.

2000 census
As of the census of 2000, there were 183 people, 81 households, and 57 families living in the town.  The population density was 3.5 people per square mile (1.3/km).  There were 189 housing units at an average density of 3.6 per square mile (1.4/km).  The racial makeup of the town was 98.36% White, and 1.64% from two or more races.

There were 81 households, out of which 23.5% had children under the age of 18 living with them, 63.0% were married couples living together, 3.7% had a female householder with no husband present, and 28.4% were non-families. 23.5% of all households were made up of individuals, and 12.3% had someone living alone who was 65 years of age or older.  The average household size was 2.26 and the average family size was 2.67.

In the town, the population was spread out, with 19.1% under the age of 18, 3.8% from 18 to 24, 26.8% from 25 to 44, 36.6% from 45 to 64, and 13.7% who were 65 years of age or older.  The median age was 45 years. For every 100 females, there were 96.8 males.  For every 100 females age 18 and over, there were 108.5 males.

The median income for a household in the town was $27,708, and the median income for a family was $32,083. Males had a median income of $36,250 versus $23,333 for females. The per capita income for the town was $14,487.  About 3.0% of families and 3.2% of the population were below the poverty line, including none of those under the age of eighteen and 17.6% of those 65 or over.

Notable people 

 Joseph Dankowski, photographer
 Edgar Wilson Nye, journalist and humorist (known popularly as Bill Nye)
 Frank Nye, politician and jurist

References

External links

Towns in Piscataquis County, Maine
Towns in Maine